My Name Is Barbra is the first of two studio album tie-ins by Barbra Streisand for her debut television special of the same name, which aired April 28, 1965 on CBS-TV. Boosted by the critical acclaim for the broadcast, the album was certified gold and peaked at #2 on the US charts; by 1966, the album sold over one million copies worldwide.

The album cover photograph of Streisand at age five was taken by her brother Sheldon. A digitally restored and remastered CD was released in 1990.

Song information
 The opening track "My Name Is Barbara" is from the song cycle I Hate Music by Leonard Bernstein, hence the spelling difference with Streisand's own name.
 The CD release contains an extended arrangement of "Why Did I Choose You?", a minute longer than the original vinyl release.
 "Where Is the Wonder" was contributed by Dion McGregor and his roommate Michael Barr, who had sent many songs to publishers and were unsuccessful in getting them recorded; they viewed Streisand's rendition as a breakthrough in their songwriting career.

Accolades
At the 8th Annual Grammy Awards the album garnered Streisand her third win for Best Female Vocal Performance, her fifth Grammy overall.

The National Association of Recording Merchandisers named Streisand the best-selling female vocalist of 1965.

Track listing

Side One
 "My Name Is Barbara" (Leonard Bernstein) – 0:53
 a. "A Kid Again" (Johnny Melfi, Roger Perry) – 1:27b. "I'm Five" (Milton Schafer) – 0:38
 "Jenny Rebecca" (Carol Hall) – 3:03
 "My Pa" (Michael Leonard, Herbert Martin) – 2:30
 "Sweet Zoo" (Jeffrey D. Harris) – 1:36
 "Where Is The Wonder" (Michael Barr, Dion McGregor) – 2:18

Side Two
 "I Can See It" (Tom Jones, Harvey Schmidt) – 3:06
 "Someone to Watch Over Me" (George Gershwin, Ira Gershwin) – 2:43
 "I've Got No Strings" (Leigh Harline, Ned Washington) – 2:49
 "If You Were the Only Boy in the World" (Nat Ayer, Clifford Grey) – 3:28
 "Why Did I Choose You?" (Michael Leonard, Herbert Martin) – CD: 3:46/Vinyl: 2:49
 "My Man" (Jacques Charles, Channing Pollock, Albert Willemetz, Maurice Yvain) – 2:57

Singles

 "Why Did I Choose You?" / "My Love": US #77 (May 1, 1965)
 "My Man" / "Where Is The Wonder ": US #79 (July 10, 1965)

Charts

Weekly charts

Year-end charts

Certifications and sales

References

External links
 Barbra Archives: My Name Is Barbra (1965)

Barbra Streisand albums
1965 albums
Albums conducted by Peter Matz
Albums arranged by Peter Matz
Columbia Records albums
Grammy Award for Best Female Pop Vocal Performance